Brimmond Hill is a hill in Aberdeen, Scotland.

The hill itself is situated in the area between Kingswells, Westhill, Blackburn and Dyce. There is a transmitter on the top of the hill, and there are also paths and a road to the top of the hill. The hill can be reached directly from paths that connect to Kingswells, and at the summit a view across the city of Aberdeen is available.

Transmitter site
The top of the hill has a collection of transmitter sites for microwave transmission, by line-of-sight communication. The communication sites from here have direct links between North Sea Oil platforms and their headquarters in Aberdeen.

References

See also

List of Scottish council areas by highest point
 British Telecom microwave network

Marilyns of Scotland
Mountains and hills of Aberdeen
Mountains and hills of the United Kingdom with toposcopes
North Sea energy
Transmitter sites in Scotland